James Peppler Morris  (born 10 January 1947) is a leading American bass-baritone opera singer. He is known for his interpretation of the role of Wotan in Richard Wagner's operatic cycle, Der Ring des Nibelungen. The Metropolitan Opera video recording of the complete cycle with Morris as Wotan has been described as an "exceptional issue on every count."  It was broadcast on PBS in 1990, to the largest viewing audience of the Ring Cycle in human history.

James Morris was born in Baltimore, Maryland, where he studied voice with Rosa Ponselle and at the Peabody Conservatory. He attended the University of Maryland and also studied at the Academy of Vocal Arts in Philadelphia, Pennsylvania. He made his debut with the Baltimore Opera in 1967, as "Crespel" in Jacques Offenbach's The Tales of Hoffmann, which starred Beverly Sills and Norman Treigle.

He first appeared in New York City at the Metropolitan Opera, in January 1971, as The King in Verdi's Aïda. He went on to establish himself as one of the most versatile male opera singers in the world, performing a repertoire ranging from Mozart through Verdi and Wagner to Benjamin Britten.

But of all the parts he has sung, Wotan arguably remains his signature role. He was considered one of the best Wotans in the world during his heyday. In January 2008, on his 61st birthday, he reprised that role in a production of Die Walküre at the Metropolitan Opera, the theater with which he is most closely associated. In 2009, alongside Deborah Voigt, he also returned there to sing "Scarpia" in Puccini's Tosca.

In addition to his imposing, well-trained voice and fine acting and musicianship, Morris, at 6 feet, 5 inches in height, had the physical stature to perform the heroic Wagnerian roles convincingly. His interpretations can be heard on a number of recordings that were made at the peak of his career. He lives in Warren Township, New Jersey with his wife, mezzo-soprano Susan Quittmeyer, and their twins, Jennifer and Daniel. He also has a daughter, Heather.

As of August 2015, Morris serves on the faculty of the Manhattan School of Music.

Awards and notable recordings 
 1990 Grammy Award for Best Opera Recording: Richard Wagner's Die Walküre, with the Metropolitan Opera Orchestra.
 1991 Grammy Award for Best Opera Recording: Richard Wagner's Das Rheingold, with the Metropolitan Opera Orchestra.
 Available on DVD, Die Meistersinger von Nürnberg by Richard Wagner, with the Metropolitan Opera Orchestra, conducted by James Levine. Sung by James Morris, Karita Mattila and Ben Heppner, etc. Produced by Deutsche Grammophon.
 Available on DVD, Otello by Giuseppe Verdi, with the Metropolitan Opera Orchestra, conducted by James Levine. Sung by Plácido Domingo, Renée Fleming and James Morris, etc. Produced by Deutsche Grammophon.
 Available on DVD, Luisa Miller by Giuseppe Verdi, with the Metropolitan Opera Orchestra, conducted by James Levine. Sung by Bonaldo Giaiotti, Plácido Domingo, Jean Kraft, Sherrill Milnes, James Morris and Renata Scotto, etc. Produced by Deutsche Grammophon.
 Available on DVD, James Levine's 25th Anniversary Metropolitan Opera Gala, with the Metropolitan Opera Orchestra, conducted by James Levine. Produced by Deutsche Grammophon.

References

External links 
 Fanfaire web page for James Morris
 

American operatic bass-baritones
Grammy Award winners
Living people
1947 births
Peabody Institute alumni
Musicians from Baltimore
People from Warren Township, New Jersey
Singers from Maryland
Singers from New Jersey
20th-century American male opera singers
21st-century American male opera singers
Classical musicians from New Jersey